Vanadium tetrachloride is the inorganic compound with the formula VCl4.  This reddish-brown liquid serves as a useful reagent for the preparation of other vanadium compounds.

Synthesis, bonding, basic properties
With one more valence electron than diamagnetic TiCl4, VCl4 is a paramagnetic liquid.  It is one of only a few paramagnetic compounds that is liquid at room temperature.

VCl4 is prepared by chlorination of vanadium metal. VCl5 does not form in this reaction; Cl2 lacks the oxidizing power to attack VCl4. VCl5 can however be prepared indirectly from VF5 at −78 °C.

Reactions
Consistent with its high oxidizing power, VCl4 reacts with HBr at -50 °C to produce VBr3.  The reaction proceeds via VBr4, which releases Br2 during warming to room temperature.
2 VCl4 + 8 HBr → 2 VBr3 + 8 HCl + Br2

VCl4 forms adducts with many donor ligands, for example, VCl4(THF)2.

It is the precursor to vanadocene dichloride.

Organic chemistry
In organic synthesis, VCl4 is used for the oxidative coupling of phenols.  For example, it converts phenol into a mixture of 4,4'-, 2,4'-, and 2,2'-biphenols: 
2 C6H5OH + 2 VCl4 → HOC6H4–C6H4OH  +  2 VCl3 + 2 HCl

Applications
VCl4 is a catalyst for the polymerization of alkenes, especially those useful in the rubber industry.  The underlying technology is related to Ziegler–Natta catalysis, which involves the intermediacy of vanadium alkyls.

Safety considerations
VCl4 is a volatile, aggressive oxidant that readily hydrolyzes to release HCl.

References

Vanadium(IV) compounds
Chlorides
Metal halides
Reagents for organic chemistry